"Pom Poms" is a song recorded by American pop rock band the Jonas Brothers. It was written by Nick Jonas, Joe Jonas, Kevin Jonas and Paul Phamous. The song was released on April 2, 2013 as the lead single from their second live album, Live by Jonas Enterprises. It is the first single not to be released by the trio under their previous label, Hollywood Records.

Background and composition

During an interview with Ryan Seacrest on February 18, 2013 they revealed that their new single would be Pom Poms; and that they planned on releasing the track sometime this spring.

On March 24, 2013 a snippet of the song and the cover art of their new single was revealed.

The Jonas Brothers were present on On Air with Ryan Seacrest, April 2, and talked about the song, later premiered it for the first time on radio and afterwards talked about other projects and returning on tour in July.

Critical reception
Bill Lamb of About.com gave the song a rating of 4.5 out of 5, praising the "irresistibly addictive pop hook" and "fusion of jazz-rock" of the song.

Music video
On March 26, 2013 a preview of the music video was released online. The sneak peek has Kevin, Nick and Joe jamming in front of some flashy pyrotechnics. A second sneak peek was leaked online on March 27, the sneak peek has girls having fun on a car. Also that same day a third sneak peek released, of the Southern University marching band. A fourth teaser was released on March 29; it shows a little boy getting his drink. The final teaser was released online on March 30, 2013; the teaser shows someone dancing in a tiger suit.

The music video premiered on April 2, 2013 on E!. The music video for the song was directed by Marc Klasfeld and filmed in February 2013 in New Orleans, Louisiana. The trio performed on a high school football field. They were accompanied by Saints and Hornets cheerleaders, the Southern University marching band and a few Jonas Brothers fans. 
Video Static wrote: "The vibe is fun and the marching band action in the coda is sure to get this track played at every high school football game this autumn."

Live performances
They were scheduled to appear on Late Night with Jimmy Fallon on April 9, 2013 and the Today Show on April 17, 2013. The episode of the Today Show aired on April 25, 2013.
They were scheduled to perform the song live on Live! with Kelly and Michael on April 18, 2013.
They performed the song again on June 1 during the Acapulco Festival in Mexico.
They are set to perform the song in a medley with First Time and as of June 14 a surprise song at the Miss USA 2013 competition.
On June 16, it was revealed that the third song was Neon.
They performed Pom Poms before First Time and Lovebug on Live Music Day.
During the first concert on July 10, they performed the song Pom Poms again.

Track listing

Chart performance

Release history

References

2013 singles
Jonas Brothers songs
Songs written by Kevin Jonas
Songs written by Joe Jonas
Songs written by Nick Jonas
2013 songs
Music videos directed by Marc Klasfeld